John Barry Clemens (born May 1, 1943) is an American former professional basketball player.  The 6' 6" Clemens attended Xenia High School and Ohio Wesleyan University before being drafted by the NBA's New York Knicks in the 1965 NBA draft, and he went on to have a productive 11-year career with five teams: the Knicks, the Chicago Bulls, the Seattle SuperSonics, the Cleveland Cavaliers, and the Portland Trail Blazers. He retired in 1976 with career totals of 5,312 points and 2,532 rebounds.

Clemens surprised many observers by making it all the way to the final round in ABC television's one-on-one NBA basketball tournament in 1973. Portland All-Star guard Geoff Petrie defeated ex-Knick Clemens in the championship game at Madison Square Garden on May 6, 1973. (www.apbr.org/forum/viewtopic.php?=1935)

In 2009, Clemens was inducted into the Ohio Basketball Hall of Fame.

References

1943 births
Living people
American men's basketball players
Basketball players from Dayton, Ohio
Chicago Bulls expansion draft picks
Chicago Bulls players
Cleveland Cavaliers players
New Orleans Jazz expansion draft picks
New York Knicks draft picks
New York Knicks players
Ohio Wesleyan Battling Bishops men's basketball players
Portland Trail Blazers players
Power forwards (basketball)
Seattle SuperSonics players
Sportspeople from Xenia, Ohio